Vincent James Phason (February 2, 1953 – September 5, 2018) was an American professional football player who played as a defensive back who played from 1975-1985 in the Canadian Football League. He was a CFL All-Star in 1982. In 1975, Phason was drafted in the NFL by the San Diego Chargers out of the University of Arizona. His football career eventually took him to Canada and the Winnipeg Blue Bombers of the CFL. He also played for the BC Lions, Edmonton Eskimos and the Montreal Concordes. Phason was paralyzed from the chest down in a November 1998 automobile accident. Seven months after being released from hospital Phason was back coaching high school football. He died on September 5, 2018 at a hospital in Denver.

References

1953 births
2018 deaths
American players of Canadian football
Arizona Wildcats football players
BC Lions players
Canadian football defensive backs
Edmonton Elks players
Montreal Concordes players
Sportspeople from Denver
Winnipeg Blue Bombers players
Players of American football from Denver